Zavarikha is a rural locality (a village) in Zavrazhskoye Rural Settlement, Nikolsky District, Vologda Oblast, Russia. The population was 57 as of 2002.

Geography 
Zavarikha is located 32 km southeast of Nikolsk (the district's administrative centre) by road. Starygino is the nearest rural locality.

References 

Rural localities in Nikolsky District, Vologda Oblast